Aleksandar "Aco" Damjanović (born July 15, 1973) is a Bosnian basketball coach and administrator and former player. He currently serves as a head coach for Slavija 1996 of the First League of R Srpska.

Playing career 
During his professional playing career Damjanović played for Banjalučka pivara, Bosna Royal, Slavija, and Radnik Bijeljina. Also, he played abroad in Cyprus, Sweden, Slovenia, and Greece.

Coaching career 
In 2016, he joined the Bosna Royal staff of head coach Dušan Gvozdić. On August 10, 2017, Damjanović was hired to be the head coach of the Bosna Royal. On January 8, 2018, he parted ways with Bosna as a head coach and became the sports director for them.

References

External links 
 Damjanovic ABA League Profile
 Player Profile at eurobasket.com
 Coach Profile at eurobasket.com

1973 births
Living people
ABA League players
Bosnia and Herzegovina basketball coaches
Bosnia and Herzegovina men's basketball players
Bosnia and Herzegovina expatriate basketball people in Greece
Bosnia and Herzegovina expatriate basketball people in Cyprus
KK Borac Banja Luka players
KK Bosna Royal coaches
KK Krka players
KK Radnik Bijeljina players
Serbs of Bosnia and Herzegovina
Basketball players from Sarajevo
Centers (basketball)
Power forwards (basketball)
KK Bosna Royal players
Bosnia and Herzegovina expatriate basketball people in Slovenia